State Route 233 (SR 233) is a  north–south state highway in the central part of the U.S. state of Georgia. It travels through portions of Ben Hill and Wilcox counties.

Route description
SR 233 begins at an intersection with SR 90 (Salem Church Road), northeast of Rebecca in northwestern Ben Hill County. About , it crosses into Wilcox County. A short distance later, it intersects Reeves Farm Road (Wilcox County Road 124), J.D. Fitzgerald Road (Wilcox CR 119), and J.B. McWorther Road (Wilcox CR 60) in rapid succession, before it intersects Owensboro Road, which leads to Abbeville. Shortly after is Taylor Road (Wilcox CR 128) and Smitty Road (Wilcox CR 68). Just after this, the route begins heading northwest, intersecting Hudson Road (Wilcox CR 131), Nelson Keene Road (Wilcox CR 115), Crawford Road (Wilcox CR 61), and later, County Farm Road (Wilcox CR 62)/East County Farm Road. Just before entering Rochelle, SR 233 intersects SR 112; they share a concurrency through the city. In Rochelle, the two routes pass local roads that provide access to Wilcox Elementary School and Donnie Clack Stadium. In downtown, they intersect SR 215 (5th Avenue). The three highways share a very brief concurrency in town. About 5 blocks later, they intersect US 280/SR 30 (1st Avenue), where SR 215 departs to the west. SR 112/SR 233 depart Rochelle to the north, passing Hawkins Road (Wilcox CR 26) before splitting. To the northeast, it intersects Brown Water Road (Wilcox CR 7), Bruce Road (Wilcox CR 36), Hackett Road (Wilcox CR 50), Barker Road (Wilcox CR 49), McDuffie Road (Wilcox CR 48), all in rapid succession. Then, it passes Helms Road (Wilcox CR 9), Matthews Road (Wilcox CR 10), McGlamry Road (Wilcox CR 302), before reaching Cannonsville Road (Wilcox CR 253, which leads to Abbeville and Pineview). Farther to the northeast is Dix Road (Wilcox CR 218) and Jean Arthur Road (Wilcox CR 216), and then Connor Road (Wilcox CR 33), before reaching its northern terminus, an intersection with US 129/SR 11 in the northeastern part of Wilcox County.

No section of SR 223 is part of the National Highway System, a system of routes determined to be the most important for the nation's economy, mobility and defense.

History
The 1944 GDOT map showed that SR 233 was established in 1944 along the same alignment as it runs today, with the portion concurrent with SR 112 being paved. However, the 1946 GDOT map showed that the paved section was only the section from an undetermined point in Rochelle to the northern intersection with SR 112. By 1952, a short section just south of Rochelle was paved. By 1961, the road was paved from its southern terminus to its northern intersection with SR 112. By 1964, the road was paved the rest of its length.

Major intersections

See also

References

External links

 

233
Transportation in Ben Hill County, Georgia
Transportation in Wilcox County, Georgia